Neoasterolepisma wasmanni is a species of silverfish in the family Lepismatidae.

References

Lepismatidae
Articles created by Qbugbot
Insects described in 1894